Pokkisham is a 2009 Tamil language film directed by Cheran. The feature failed at the box office compared to Cheran's previous work, Autograph. Movie dubbed by Meena and Prasanna.

Plot 
In 1970, a marine engineer Lenin from Calcutta comes across a Nagore girl Nadira. Started with friendship, later seeded with love, Lenin mails a letter once a month. When Lenin came to Nagore, he was disappointed and sad as Nadira and her family left the place after selling their home. Years later, Mahesh, son of Lenin, found his father's hidden life from reading his diary. With help from his friend Shamsudeen, he marches his way to find Nadira and deliver the letter to her. He learns that Nadira has shifted to Malaysia after marriage. He goes to Malaysia to meet her. Once he reaches her house, he is greeted by Nadira's son who welcomes him to the house. Nadira is now very old and asks Mahesh as to who he is and how he knows her. He replies saying he is Lenin's son and also informs her that his father died a few years earlier. Nadira is grief-stricken. Mahesh gives her Lenin's last few letters which he could not post because he did not have Nadira's address. In those letters, Lenin has spoken about his journey to find Nadira after she and her family shifted from Nagore. He describes his pain and grief over not knowing about her situation during those days, and also about his father who coaxed him to marry another girl, who is now his wife and is very understanding. Nadira then drops Mahesh to the airport and while on the way she request him to let her talk to his mother. Nadira and Mahesh's mother exchange good notes and then she finally drops him to the airport. While returning, she is talking to herself as well as to Lenin saying that she showed her anguish and punished her father by denying to marry anyone. She currently lives with her sister and her lovable family and apologises and promises Lenin that she will join him soon and never separate.

Cast

Production
In early 2002, Cheran announced that he was going to make a film titled Pokkisham and Kanika would star alongside him. However he failed to find a financier and instead moved back to making Autograph (2004). Cheran then prepared to work on Pokkisham in 2004, after the release of Autograph but postponed the film after falling out with the new lead actress Meera Jasmine. He restarted work on the film in December 2005, after completing Thavamai Thavamirundhu (2005), and approached Sandhya to play the lead role.

Soundtrack 
The soundtrack album was composed by the duo Sabesh–Murali.

References

External links 
 

2009 films
2009 romantic drama films
Indian romantic drama films
Films set in 1970
Films set in Kolkata
Films shot in Kolkata
Films directed by Cheran
2000s Tamil-language films